The Fan is a district of Richmond, Virginia, so named because of the "fan" shape of the array of streets that extend west from Belvidere Street, on the eastern edge of Monroe Park, westward to Arthur Ashe Boulevard.  However, the streets rapidly resemble a grid after they go through what is now Virginia Commonwealth University.  The Fan is one of the easterly points of the city's West End section, and is bordered to the north by Broad Street and to the south by VA 195, although the Fan District Association considers the southern border to be the properties abutting the south side of Main Street. The western side is sometimes called the Upper Fan and the eastern side the Lower Fan, though confusingly the Uptown district is located near VCU in the Lower Fan.  Many cafes and locally owned restaurants are located here, as well as historic Monument Avenue, a boulevard formerly featuring statuary of the Civil War's Confederate president and generals.  The only current statue is a more modern one of tennis icon Arthur Ashe. Development of the Fan district was strongly influenced by the City Beautiful movement of the late 19th century.

The Fan District is primarily a residential neighborhood consisting of late-nineteenth and early-twentieth century homes.  It is also home to VCU's Monroe Park Campus, several parks, and tree-lined avenues.  The District also has numerous houses of worship, and locally owned businesses and commercial establishments. The Fan borders and blends with the Boulevard, the Museum District, and the Carytown district, which features the ornate Byrd Theatre.  The appearance of the Fan District is frequently compared to that of the Bourbon Street neighborhood in New Orleans although the two places are actually quite different architecturally upon close examination.

Main east-west thoroughfares include Broad Street, Grace Street, Monument Avenue, Patterson Avenue, Grove Avenue, Floyd Avenue, Main Street, Parkwood Ave, and Cary Street.

Architecture 
Following a succession of owners, an architecture museum, the Virginia Center for Architecture, took occupancy in 2005 of  Branch House on Monument Avenue, a residence designed in the Tudor style by the firm of John Russell Pope in 1914.

The Fan is known for having one of the longest intact stretches of Victorian architecture in the United States, however much of the housing stock was actually built after the end of the Victorian era and is arguably more Edwardian and Revival in style.  While housing in the Eastern parts of the neighborhood are quintessential Victorian styles, such as Italianate and Queen Anne,  housing stock further west was constructed in the first decades of the twentieth century and exhibits the pared back victorianism of Edwardian architecture. Homes still contain fancied Gables and turrets, but detail is normally executed in a simplified classical form.  Colonial Revival and American Craftsman architecture are common as well, with Revival architectural types arguably the most common (as was common to the time period) Revivalism (architecture).

Primary architectural styles represented include: 
 Italianate
 Richardsonian Romanesque
 Queen Anne
 Colonial Revival

Other architectural styles include:
 Tudor Revival
 Second Empire
 Beaux-Arts
 Art Deco
 Spanish
 Gothic Revival
 Bungalow
 American Arts and Crafts Movement
 James River Georgian
 Southern Colonial
 Jacobethan (Jacobean Revival)
 Federal

History 

In 1817, the Fan was plotted as the village of Sydney on land formerly owned by William Byrd II. Primary development of the Fan occurred after the Civil War through about 1920.  Streetcar lines leading from downtown influenced development; the nation's first electric streetcar system was inaugurated in Richmond in 1888.

As development increased from downtown at the turn of the 20th century, Franklin street became a fashionable "West End"  address. A desire for a West End address drove rapid real estate development of the area, changing the area from rural tobacco fields in 1880 to being almost fully developed land by the 1920s. As development accelerated, the University of Richmond (then located on Lombardy Street) was moved west to a more rural location (its present Westhampton location). During the Great Depression, many of the single-family homes in the area were converted to apartments.

The term "the Fan" was coined in the mid 20th century by a Richmond Times Dispatch editorial, as the appellation "West End"  no longer applied.

Maps
 Wikimapia

References

External links
 The Fan District Association
 History of the Fan: A series of historical narratives by Fan District Association Historian Gail Zwirner
Fan of the Fan (community news blog)
Fan of the Fan: A look at the history and architecture of the Fan Area Historic District

Neighborhoods in Richmond, Virginia
Houses on the National Register of Historic Places in Virginia
Historic districts on the National Register of Historic Places in Virginia
Georgian architecture in Virginia
National Register of Historic Places in Richmond, Virginia
Houses in Richmond, Virginia